OCJ may refer to:

 IATA code for Ian Fleming International Airport
 Japanese Orthodox Church
 Ontario Court of Justice
 Orange County Jail